{{Infobox media franchise
| title = Chilly Willy
| image = 
| creator = 
| owner = 
| years = 
| origin = Chilly Willy (1953)
| comics = 
| films = Who Framed Roger Rabbit (1988) (cameo)
| shorts = {{plainlist|
Chilly Willy (1953)
I'm Cold (1954)
Hot and Cold Penguin (1955)
}}
| atv = 
| wtv = 
| tv_specials = 
| dtv = 
| plays = 
| musicals = 
| vgs = 
| soundtracks = 
| toys = 
| attractions = 
| website = http://www.chillywillyfan.com/
}} 
This is a list of Walter Lantz "Cartunes" featuring Chilly Willy.  All are entries in Lantz's Chilly Willy series.

Directors for each short are noted. The first five cartoons (Chilly Willy through Room and Wrath) were released in The Woody Woodpecker and Friends Classic Cartoon Collection. Five additional shorts, including Hold That Rock and Half-Baked Alaska, were released in The Woody Woodpecker and Friends Classic Cartoon Collection: Volume 2.

1950s
1953

1954

1955

1956

1957

1958

1959

1960s
1960

1961

1962

1963

1964

1965

1966

1967

1968

1969

1970s
1970

1971

1972

References
 Tatay, Jack, Komorowski, Thad, Shakarian, Pietro, and Cooke, Jon. The Walter Lantz Cartune Encyclopedia''. Retrieved February 29, 2008.

Film series introduced in 1953
Chilly Willy theatrical cartoons, List of
Chilly Willy theatrical cartoons, list of
Animated films about penguins